Ypthima diplommata is a butterfly in the family Nymphalidae. It is found in the Democratic Republic of the Congo (Lualaba) and western Zambia.

References

diplommat
Butterflies of Africa
Butterflies described in 1954